Aerogels are a class of synthetic porous ultralight material derived from a gel, in which the liquid component for the gel has been replaced with a gas, without significant collapse of the gel structure. The result is a solid with extremely low density and extremely low thermal conductivity. Aerogels can be made from a variety of chemical compounds. Silica aerogels feel like fragile expanded polystyrene to the touch, while some polymer-based aerogels feel like rigid foams. 

The first documented example of an aerogel was created by Samuel Stephens Kistler in 1931, as a result of a bet with Charles Learned over who could replace the liquid in "jellies" with gas without causing shrinkage.

Aerogels are produced by extracting the liquid component of a gel through supercritical drying or freeze-drying. This allows the liquid to be slowly dried off without causing the solid matrix in the gel to collapse from capillary action, as would happen with conventional evaporation. The first aerogels were produced from silica gels. Kistler's later work involved aerogels based on alumina, chromia and tin dioxide. Carbon aerogels were first developed in the late 1980s.

Properties
 Despite the name, aerogels are solid, rigid, and dry materials that do not resemble a gel in their physical properties: the name comes from the fact that they are made from gels. Pressing softly on an aerogel typically does not leave even a minor mark; pressing more firmly will leave a permanent depression. Pressing extremely firmly will cause a catastrophic breakdown in the sparse structure, causing it to shatter like glass (a property known as friability), although more modern variations do not suffer from this. Despite the fact that it is prone to shattering, it is very strong structurally. Its impressive load-bearing abilities are due to the dendritic microstructure, in which spherical particles of average size 2–5 nm are fused together into clusters. These clusters form a three-dimensional highly porous structure of almost fractal chains, with pores just under 100 nm. The average size and density of the pores can be controlled during the manufacturing process.

An aerogel material can range from 50% to 99.98% air by volume, but in practice most aerogels exhibit somewhere between 90 to 99.8% porosity. Aerogels have a porous solid network that contains air pockets, with the air pockets taking up the majority of space within the material.

Aerogels are good thermal insulators because they almost nullify two of the three methods of heat transfer – conduction (they are mostly composed of insulating gas) and convection (the microstructure prevents net gas movement). They are good conductive insulators because they are composed almost entirely of gases, which are very poor heat conductors. (Silica aerogel is an especially good insulator because silica is also a poor conductor of heat; a metallic or carbon aerogel, on the other hand, would be less effective.) They are good convective inhibitors because air cannot circulate through the lattice. Aerogels are poor radiative insulators because infrared radiation (which transfers heat) passes through them.

Owing to its hygroscopic nature, aerogel feels dry and acts as a strong desiccant. People handling aerogel for extended periods should wear gloves to prevent the appearance of dry brittle spots on their skin.

The slight colour it does have is due to Rayleigh scattering of the shorter wavelengths of visible light by the nano-sized dendritic structure. This causes it to appear smoky blue against dark backgrounds and yellowish against bright backgrounds.

Aerogels by themselves are hydrophilic, and if they absorb moisture they usually suffer a structural change, such as contraction, and deteriorate, but degradation can be prevented by making them hydrophobic, via a chemical treatment. Aerogels with hydrophobic interiors are less susceptible to degradation than aerogels with only an outer hydrophobic layer, especially if a crack penetrates the surface.

Knudsen effect 
Aerogels may have a thermal conductivity smaller than that of the gas they contain. This is caused by the Knudsen effect, a reduction of thermal conductivity in gases when the size of the cavity encompassing the gas becomes comparable to the mean free path. Effectively, the cavity restricts the movement of the gas particles, decreasing the thermal conductivity in addition to eliminating convection. For example, thermal conductivity of air is about 25 mW·m−1·K−1 at STP and in a large container, but decreases to about 5 mW·m−1·K−1 in a pore 30 nanometers in diameter.

Structure 
Aerogel structure results from a sol-gel polymerization, which is when monomers (simple molecules) react with other monomers to form a sol or a substance that consists of bonded, cross-linked macromolecules with deposits of liquid solution among them. When the material is critically heated, the liquid evaporates and the bonded, cross-linked macromolecule frame is left behind.  The result of the polymerization and critical heating is the creation of a material that has a porous strong structure classified as aerogel. Variations in synthesis can alter the surface area and pore size of the aerogel. The smaller the pore size the more susceptible the aerogel is to fracture.

Waterproofing 
Aerogel contains particles that are 2–5 nm in diameter.  After the process of creating aerogel, it will contain a large amount of hydroxyl groups on the surface.  The hydroxyl groups can cause a strong reaction when the aerogel is placed in water, causing it to catastrophically dissolve in the water.  One way to waterproof the hydrophilic aerogel is by soaking the aerogel with some chemical base that will replace the surface hydroxyl groups (–OH) with non-polar groups (–OR), a process which is most effective when R is an aliphatic group.

Porosity of aerogel 
There are several ways to determine the porosity of aerogel: the three main methods are gas adsorption, mercury porosimetry, and scattering method. In gas adsorption, nitrogen at its boiling point is adsorbed into the aerogel sample. The gas being adsorbed is dependent on the size of the pores within the sample and on the partial pressure of the gas relative to its saturation pressure.  The volume of the gas adsorbed is measured by using the Brunauer, Emmit and Teller formula (BET), which gives the specific surface area of the sample.  At high partial pressure in the adsorption/desorption the Kelvin equation gives the pore size distribution of the sample.  In mercury porosimetry, the mercury is forced into the aerogel porous system to determine the pores' size, but this method is highly inefficient since the solid frame of aerogel will collapse from the high compressive force.  The scattering method involves the angle-dependent deflection of radiation within the aerogel sample.  The sample can be solid particles or pores.  The radiation goes into the material and determines the fractal geometry of the aerogel pore network.  The best radiation wavelengths to use are X-rays and neutrons.  Aerogel is also an open porous network: the difference between an open porous network and a closed porous network is that in the open network, gases can enter and leave the substance without any limitation, while a closed porous network traps the gases within the material forcing them to stay within the pores. The high porosity and surface area of silica aerogels allow them to be used in a variety of environmental filtration applications.

Materials

Silica aerogel 

Silica aerogels are the most common type of aerogel, and the primary type in use or study. It is silica-based and can be derived from silica gel or by a modified Stober process. Nicknames include frozen smoke, solid smoke, solid air, solid cloud, and blue smoke, owing to its translucent nature and the way light scatters in the material. The lowest-density silica nanofoam weighs 1,000 g/m3, which is the evacuated version of the record-aerogel of 1,900 g/m3. The density of air is 1,200 g/m3 (at 20 °C and 1 atm). , aerographene had a lower density at 160 g/m3, or 13% the density of air at room temperature.

The silica solidifies into three-dimensional, intertwined clusters that make up only 3% of the volume. Conduction through the solid is therefore very low. The remaining 97% of the volume is composed of air in extremely small nanopores. The air has little room to move, inhibiting both convection and gas-phase conduction.

Silica aerogel also has a high optical transmission of ~99% and a low refractive index of ~1.05. It is very robust with respect to high power input beam in continuous wave regime and does not show any boiling or melting phenomena.  This property permits to study high intensity nonlinear waves in the presence of disorder in regimes typically unaccessible by liquid materials, making it promising material for nonlinear optics.  

This aerogel has remarkable thermal insulative properties, having an extremely low thermal conductivity: from 0.03 W·m−1·K−1 in atmospheric pressure down to 0.004 W·m−1·K−1 in modest vacuum, which correspond to R-values of 14 to 105 (US customary) or 3.0 to 22.2 (metric) for  thickness. For comparison, typical wall insulation is 13 (US customary) or 2.7 (metric) for the same thickness. It is also worth noting that even lower conductivities have been reported for experimentally produced monolithic samples in the literature, reaching 0.009 W·m−1·K−1 at 1atm.

Until 2011, silica aerogel held 15 entries in Guinness World Records for material properties, including best insulator and lowest-density solid, though it was ousted from the latter title by the even lighter materials aerographite in 2012 and then aerographene in 2013.

Carbon 
Carbon aerogels are composed of particles with sizes in the nanometer range, covalently bonded together. They have very high porosity (over 50%, with pore diameter under 100 nm) and surface areas ranging between 400 and 1,000 m2/g. They are often manufactured as composite paper: non-woven paper made of carbon fibers, impregnated with resorcinol–formaldehyde aerogel, and pyrolyzed. Depending on the density, carbon aerogels may be electrically conductive, making composite aerogel paper useful for electrodes in capacitors or deionization electrodes. Due to their extremely high surface area, carbon aerogels are used to create supercapacitors, with values ranging up to thousands of farads based on a capacitance density of 104 F/g and 77 F/cm3. Carbon aerogels are also extremely "black" in the infrared spectrum, reflecting only 0.3% of radiation between 250 nm and 14.3 µm, making them efficient for solar energy collectors.

The term "aerogel" to describe airy masses of carbon nanotubes produced through certain chemical vapor deposition techniques is incorrect. Such materials can be spun into fibers with strength greater than Kevlar, and unique electrical properties. These materials are not aerogels, however, since they do not have a monolithic internal structure and do not have the regular pore structure characteristic of aerogels.

Metal oxide 
Metal oxide aerogels are used as catalysts in various chemical reactions/transformations or as precursors for other materials.

Aerogels made with aluminium oxide are known as alumina aerogels. These aerogels are used as catalysts, especially when "doped" with a metal other than aluminium. Nickel–alumina aerogel is the most common combination. Alumina aerogels are also being considered by NASA for capturing hypervelocity particles; a formulation doped with gadolinium and terbium could fluoresce at the particle impact site, with the amount of fluorescence dependent on impact energy.

One of the most notable differences between silica aerogels and metal oxide aerogel is that metal oxide aerogels are often variedly colored.

Other 
Organic polymers can be used to create aerogels. SEAgel is made of agar. AeroZero film is made of polyimide.  Cellulose from plants can be used to create a flexible aerogel.

GraPhage13 is the first graphene-based aerogel assembled using graphene oxide and the M13 bacteriophage.

Chalcogel is an aerogel made of chalcogens (the column of elements on the periodic table beginning with oxygen) such as sulfur, selenium and other elements. Metals less expensive than platinum have been used in its creation.

Aerogels made of cadmium selenide quantum dots in a porous 3-D network have been developed for use in the semiconductor industry.

Aerogel performance may be augmented for a specific application by the addition of dopants, reinforcing structures and hybridizing compounds. For example, Spaceloft is a composite of aerogel with some kind of fibrous batting.

Applications 
Aerogels are used for a variety of applications:
 Thermal insulation; with fibre reinforced silica aerogel insulation boards insulation thickness can be reduced by about 50% compared to conventional materials. This makes silica aerogel boards well suited for the retrofit of historic buildings or for the application in dense city areas. As other examples, aerogel has been added in granular form to skylights for this purpose. Georgia Institute of Technology's 2007 Solar Decathlon House project used an aerogel as an insulator in the semi-transparent roof.
 A chemical adsorber for cleaning up spills. Silica aerogels may be used for filtration; They have a high surface area, porosity, and are ultrahydrophobic. They may be used for the removal of heavy metals. This could be applied to wastewater treatment.
 As a daytime radiative cooling surface that is designed to be efficient in solar radiation and thermal emittance. Aerogels may be lower in cost and negative environmental impacts than other materials.
 A catalyst or a catalyst carrier.
 Silica aerogels can be used in imaging devices, optics, and light guides.
 Thickening agents in some paints and cosmetics.
 As components in energy absorbers.
 Laser targets for the United States National Ignition Facility (NIF).
 A material used in impedance matchers for transducers, speakers and range finders.
 According to Hindawi's Journal of Nanomaterials, aerogels are used for more flexible materials such as clothing and blankets: "Commercial manufacture of aerogel 'blankets' began around the year 2000, combining silica aerogel and fibrous reinforcement that turns the brittle aerogel into a durable, flexible material. The mechanical and thermal properties of the product may be varied based upon the choice of reinforcing fibers, the aerogel matrix and opacification additives included in the composite."
 Silica aerogel has been used to capture cosmic dust, also known as space dust. NASA used an aerogel to trap space dust particles aboard the Stardust spacecraft. These aerogel dust collectors have very low mass. The particles vaporize on impact with solids and pass through gases, but can be trapped in aerogels. NASA also used aerogel for thermal insulation for the Mars rovers.
 The US Navy evaluated use of aerogels in undergarments as passive thermal protection for divers. Similarly, aerogels have been used by NASA for insulating space suits.
 In particle physics as radiators in Cherenkov effect detectors, such as the ACC system of the Belle detector, used in the Belle experiment at KEKB. The suitability of aerogels is determined by their low index of refraction, filling the gap between gases and liquids, and their transparency and solid state, making them easier to use than cryogenic liquids or compressed gases.
 Resorcinol–formaldehyde aerogels (polymers chemically similar to phenol formaldehyde resins) are used as precursors for manufacture of carbon aerogels, or when an organic insulator with large surface is desired.
 Metal–aerogel nanocomposites prepared by impregnating the hydrogel with solution containing ions of a transition metal and irradiating the result with gamma rays, precipitates nanoparticles of the metal. Such composites can be used as catalysts, sensors, electromagnetic shielding, and in waste disposal. A prospective use of platinum-on-carbon catalysts is in fuel cells.
 As a drug delivery system owing to its biocompatibility. Due to its high surface area and porous structure, drugs can be adsorbed from supercritical . The release rate of the drugs can be tailored by varying the properties of the aerogel.
 Carbon aerogels are used in the construction of small electrochemical double layer supercapacitors. Due to the high surface area of the aerogel, these capacitors can be 1/2000th to 1/5000th the size of similarly rated electrolytic capacitors. According to Hindawi's Journal of Nanomaterials,  "Aerogel supercapacitors can have a very low impedance compared to normal supercapacitors and can absorb or produce very high peak currents. At present, such capacitors are polarity-sensitive and need to be wired in series if a working voltage of greater than about 2.75 V is needed."
 Dunlop Sport uses aerogel in some of its racquets for sports such as tennis.
 In water purification, chalcogels have shown promise in absorbing the heavy metal pollutants mercury, lead, and cadmium from water. Aerogels may be used to separate oil from water, which could for example be used to respond to oil spills. Aerogels may be used to disinfect water, killing bacteria.
 Aerogel can introduce disorder into superfluid helium-3.
 In aircraft de-icing, a new proposal uses a carbon nanotube aerogel. A thin filament is spun on a winder to create a 10 micron-thick film. The amount of material needed to cover the wings of a jumbo jet weighs . Aerogel heaters could be left on continuously at low power, to prevent ice from forming.
 Thermal insulation transmission tunnel of the Chevrolet Corvette (C7).
 CamelBak uses aerogel as insulation in a thermal sport bottle.
 45 North uses aerogel as palm insulation in its Sturmfist 5 cycling gloves.
 Silica aerogels may be used for sound insulation, such as on windows or for construction purposes.
 It has been suggested that Fogbank, a material of secret composition used in U.S. thermonuclear warheads, may be an aerogel.

Production 

Silica aerogels are typically synthesized by using a sol-gel process. The first step is the creation of a colloidal suspension of solid particles known as a "sol". The precursors are a liquid alcohol such as ethanol which is mixed with a silicon alkoxide, such as tetramethoxysilane (TMOS), tetraethoxysilane (TEOS), and polyethoxydisiloxane (PEDS) (earlier work used sodium silicates). The solution of silica is mixed with a catalyst and allowed to gel during a hydrolysis reaction which forms particles of silicon dioxide. The oxide suspension begins to undergo condensation reactions which result in the creation of metal oxide bridges (either M–O–M, "oxo" bridges, or M–OH–M, "ol" bridges) linking the dispersed colloidal particles.  These reactions generally have moderately slow reaction rates, and as a result either acidic or basic catalysts are used to improve the processing speed. Basic catalysts tend to produce more transparent aerogels and minimize the shrinkage during the drying process and also strengthen it to prevent pore collapse during drying.

Finally, during the drying process of the aerogel, the liquid surrounding the silica network is carefully removed and replaced with air, while keeping the aerogel intact. Gels where the liquid is allowed to evaporate at a natural rate are known as xerogels. As the liquid evaporates, forces caused by surface tensions of the liquid-solid interfaces are enough to destroy the fragile gel network. As a result, xerogels cannot achieve the high porosities and instead peak at lower porosities and exhibit large amounts of shrinkage after drying. To avoid the collapse of fibers during slow solvent evaporation and reduce surface tensions of the liquid-solid interfaces, aerogels can be formed by lyophilization (freeze-drying). Depending on the concentration of the fibers and the temperature to freeze the material, the properties such as porosity of the final aerogel will be affected.

In 1931, to develop the first aerogels, Kistler used a process known as supercritical drying which avoids a direct phase change. By increasing the temperature and pressure he forced the liquid into a supercritical fluid state where by dropping the pressure he could instantly gasify and remove the liquid inside the aerogel, avoiding damage to the delicate three-dimensional network. While this can be done with ethanol, the high temperatures and pressures lead to dangerous processing conditions. A safer, lower temperature and pressure method involves a solvent exchange. This is typically done by exchanging the initial aqueous pore liquid for a CO2-miscible liquid such as ethanol or acetone, then onto liquid carbon dioxide and then bringing the carbon dioxide above its critical point. A variant on this process involves the direct injection of supercritical carbon dioxide into the pressure vessel containing the aerogel. The end result of either process exchanges the initial liquid from the gel with carbon dioxide, without allowing the gel structure to collapse or lose volume.

Resorcinol–formaldehyde aerogel (RF aerogel) is made in a way similar to production of silica aerogel. A carbon aerogel can then be made from this resorcinol–formaldehyde aerogel by pyrolysis in an inert gas atmosphere, leaving a matrix of carbon. The resulting carbon aerogel may be used to produce solid shapes, powders, or composite paper. Additives have been successful in enhancing certain properties of the aerogel for the use of specific applications. Aerogel composites have been made using a variety of continuous and discontinuous reinforcements. The high aspect ratio of fibers such as fiberglass have been used to reinforce aerogel composites with significantly improved mechanical properties.

Safety 
Silica-based aerogels are not known to be carcinogenic or toxic. However, they are a mechanical irritant to the eyes, skin, respiratory tract, and digestive system. They can also induce dryness of the skin, eyes, and mucous membranes. Therefore, it is recommended that protective gear including respiratory protection, gloves and eye goggles be worn whenever handling or processing bare aerogels, particularly when a dust or fine fragments may occur.

See also 
 Carbon nanofoam
 Nanogel
 Fogbank

References 

 Further reading
 NASA's Stardust comet return mission on AEROGEL.

External links 

 Open source aerogel
 NASA photos of aerogel
 LBL article covering the development of aerogels

Emerging technologies
Aerogels